Nev the Bear is a small, blue puppet bear that originally appeared in the CBBC television programme Smile. Since 2007, Nev has starred in his own CBBC show Bear Behaving Badly, alongside Barney Harwood. His name was created from the name of his co-star Dev Griffin on Smile. He was last seen on Hacker Time when Derek puts Nev on Line 1 for Barney Harwood. Nev has patches in places on his body and is missing part of his ear. This is due to Bandit the cat, who is seen in some episodes of Bear Behaving Badly, trying to eat him. Nev often has trouble with pronunciation of certain words, he cannot sing but he can rap well. 

Nev likes ice cream, jam, dressing up, sleeping in and his 'snuggly ducky duck duck'. When scared or intimidated, he growls, just like a real bear would. Originally on Smile, the voice of Nev was prerecorded with his limited vocabulary being played in as appropriate. When Nev took on a more significant role in Smile, puppeteer Ross Mullan, who also stars in Bear Behaving Badly, was recruited to provide the voice live. 

On 28 December 2007, Nev appeared on a puppet special of The Weakest Link hosted by Anne Robinson and broadcast on BBC One, but was eliminated in the fourth round of play, and as hinted in his post-elimination interview, he has a crush on both Soo and host Anne Robinson. In 2004, a soft plush Nev was released, but was only available in a few stores. 

In 2005, a talking Nev was released, speaking a number of catch phrases including "Fwightened" and "No no no no". A complaint was made against the toy with regard to the word "Quick", by an individual who believed she had heard a similar-sounding profanity instead. A smaller version of the soft toy has since been released.

References

External links
CBBC website
Production company website

BBC Television
British comedy puppets
Fictional teddy bears
Television characters introduced in 2002